Turbo Teen is an American animated television series about a teenager with the ability to transform into a sports car. It aired on Saturday morning on the ABC Network for thirteen episodes in 1984.

The series was rerun on the USA Network's  USA Cartoon Express programming block.

Plot

Turbo Teen is about a teenager named Brett Matthews who swerves off a road during a thunderstorm and crashes into a secret government laboratory. There, he and his red sports car are accidentally exposed to a molecular beam, invented by a scientist named Dr. Chase for a government agent named Cauldwell. As a result, Brett and his car become fused together. Brett gains the ability to morph into the car when exposed to extreme heat and revert into his human form when exposed to extreme cold. With this new superhero power, Brett, along with his girlfriend Pattie (a freelance reporter), his best friend Alex (a mechanic who calls Brett "TT"), and his dog Rusty go on crime-fighting adventures together and solve other mysteries.

A recurring subplot involves Brett's, Cauldwell's, and Dr. Chase's search for a way to return Brett to normal. Also, a recurring villain is the mysterious, unseen "Dark Rider" who drives a monster truck and seeks to capture Brett in order to find the secret behind his abilities. Dark Rider is voiced by Frank Welker.

Production
The show was produced by Ruby-Spears Productions with animation supplied by Toei Animation and Hanho Heung-Up. It was broadcast during the growing popularity of the Knight Rider television series and mirrors much of it. The car that Brett turns into looks like an amalgam of a Third Generation Chevrolet Camaro and its sister car, the Pontiac Trans Am; the later model Knight Rider's KITT is based on. The Trans Am also had limited edition turbocharger packages in the early 1980's, appearing as an official Indy 500 pace car and featuring in the movie Smokey and the Bandit II.

Cast
 T. K. Carter as Alex
 Pat Fraley as Eddie, Dr. Chase
 Pamela Hayden as Pattie
 Michael Mish as Brett Matthews/Turbo Teen
 Clive Revill as Cardwell
 Frank Welker as Rusty, Dark Rider, Flip

Additional voices

 Nelson Comer
 Alan Dinehart
 Ron Feinberg
 Alejandro Garay

 Linda Gary
 Bob Holt
 William Martin
 Michael Sheehan

Episodes

Crew
 Alan Dinehart - Voice Director
 Howard Morris - Voice Director
 Michael Maurer - Story Editor
 John Kimball - Director
 Jack Kirby - Production Design

Reception
In The Encyclopedia of American Animated Television Shows, David Perlmutter writes, "This is perhaps the most absurd concept developed for television animation in the genre's history. Despite a basis in somewhat-plausible science, it was not produced competently enough to make its premise anywhere near believable."

Parodies

 Turbo Teen was parodied in the Robot Chicken episode "Rabbits on a Roller Coaster" with Brett Matthews voiced by Seth Green, Alex voiced by Tom Root and Pattie voiced by Katee Sackhoff.
 A webcomic named Teen Boat ran for a short time, with a teenager who could turn into a small yacht. It was later released as a graphic novel.
 A commercial for The Rotten Tomatoes Show on Current TV in July 2009 includes a man similarly transforming into a red sports car, a Mazda Miata. The man is wearing a wardrobe similar to Brett Matthews' wardrobe.
 The Rick and Morty episode "The Ricks Must Be Crazy" parodies Turbo Teen, revealing that Morty can also transform into a car (and ultimately does, in a similar-looking fashion).
 In the Simpsons Comics story "Con-nukah!", a toy called "Turbo Poochie Teen" appears on Bart's wishlist.
 In the Futurama episode "The Honking", Bender turns into a were-car. The transformation sequence is the same as in Turbo Teen.
 The 2-part Teen Titans Go! episode "Teen Titans Vroom!" parodies Turbo Teen, when the Teen Titans suddenly turn into cars.

References

External links

Episode guide at the Big Cartoon DataBase

1980s American animated television series
1984 American television series debuts
1985 American television series endings
American Broadcasting Company original programming
American children's animated science fiction television series
American children's animated superhero television series
English-language television shows
Fictional cars
Ruby-Spears superheroes
Television series about shapeshifting
Teen animated television series
Teen superhero television series
Television series by Ruby-Spears
Television series by Warner Bros. Television Studios